Olga Vladimirovna Doroshina (born 24 June 1994) is an inactive Russian tennis player.

On 24 September 2018, she achieved a career-high singles ranking of world No. 221. On 1 April 2019, she peaked at No. 134 in the WTA doubles rankings.

WTA 125 tournament finals

Doubles: 1 (runner-up)

ITF finals

Singles: 16 (8 titles, 8 runner–ups)

Doubles: 36 (26–10)

References

External links
 
 

1994 births
Living people
Russian female tennis players
Tennis players from Moscow
21st-century Russian women
20th-century Russian women